Streptomyces silaceus is a bacterium species from the genus of Streptomyces which has been isolated from an equine placenta in Lexington in Kentucky in the United States.

See also 
 List of Streptomyces species

References

Further reading

External links
Type strain of Streptomyces silaceus at BacDive -  the Bacterial Diversity Metadatabase	

silaceus
Bacteria described in 2009